Anglesea Road Cricket Ground is a cricket ground  based on Anglesea Road in Ballsbridge, Dublin 4, Ireland. The first recorded match on the ground was in 1971, when South Leinster played Ulster Country.  The ground has hosted a single List-A match which saw Papua New Guinea play the United States.

The ground has also hosted Women's One Day Internationals, one of which came in 2004 and saw Ireland women play New Zealand women.

In local domestic cricket, the ground is the home of Merrion Cricket Club who play in the Leinster League Division Two.

References

External links
Anglesea Road on Cricinfo

Cricket grounds in the Republic of Ireland
Sports venues in Dublin (city)
Sports venues completed in 1971
Cricket grounds in County Dublin